Pansarbandvagn 302 (pbv 302), meaning roughly armoured tracked carrier vehicle 302, was a Swedish high-mobility infantry fighting vehicle used by the Swedish Army from 1966 to 2014.

The vehicle was commissioned by the Swedish Army in 1961 as a modern IFV-design which could replace the recently developed pbv 301 IFV, a placeholder design based on an obsolete tank chassis which did not meet the Swedish Army's future operational requirements. Design and production was handled by Hägglund & Söner in Örnsköldsvik (today BAE Systems Hägglunds). Production ran from 1966 to 1971 and the vehicles were upgraded and renovated multiple times throughout their service life. The design was eventually replaced by the strf 9040 IFV in the 1990s but saw limited service alongside it until ultimately being removed from service in 2014.

Armament consisted of a modified 20 mm Hispano HS-804 cannon in a one man turret and internal racks for weapons of the mechanized infantry, such as their service weapons, a ksp 58 squad machine gun and a Carl Gustaf 8.4 cm recoilless rifle, along with ammunition. Later variants got updated with racks for AT4s and some vehicles even received a Bofors BILL man-portable anti-tank missile system. As part of the Swedish IFV-doctrine the vehicle came equipped with roof doors allowing the mechanized infantry to fight from within the vehicles.

Description 
The Pbv 302 has wide tracks and a high power-to-weight ratio, and has exceptionally good off-road mobility, and the low ground pressure enables it to operate over summer bog and winter snow. It is powered by a Volvo 10-liter, 270 hp diesel engine. The vehicle is fully amphibious with little preparation by the crew. It is fitted with a 20 mm Hispano-Suiza type 804 cannon taken from the scrapped Saab 29 in a one-man turret. High-explosive cartridges were originally fed from 135-round belts, and armor-piercing cartridges were fed from a 10-round magazine. Three belts and 10 magazines were carried inside the vehicle. The arrangement was deemed overly complicated and was replaced by 30-round magazines, 10 of which were carried. The vehicle, which weighs 14 tonnes, has a crew of three (commander, driver and a gunner) and carries a squad of eight troops. The infantry squad is able to fight through two large roof hatches, though standard procedure would be to dismount through the two side-hinged doors in the rear to fight. Maximum road speed is 65 km/h (restricted for peace time use). The range on roads is about 300 km.

The Pbv 302 shares common components with the Ikv 91 tank destroyer and total production was approximately 650 units.

Versions and variants
 Pansarbandvagn 302A: The original standard troop transport/IFV version. Its designation translates literally into armoured tracked vehicle.
 Pansarbandvagn 302B: Upgraded with spalling liner and external armour.
 Pansarbandvagn 302C: As Pbv 302B, with reinforced suspension, new lights, flare-launcher, new turbo and air condition. It has mainly been used for UN and KFOR missions.
Variants available in several versions, noted with the appropriate letter (i.e. Epbv 3022C)
 Stridsledningspansarbandvagn (Stripbv) 3021: The C3I command post for battalion and brigade commanders and other staff members. Designation means battle command vehicle.
 Eldledningspansarbandvagn (Epbv) 3022: Forward observer vehicle for artillery observers fire control personnel. Designation means fire directing vehicle.
 Batteriplatspansarbandvagn (Bplpbv) 3023: The battery command control vehicle attached to Bandkanon 1 batteries. Designation means (artillery) battery command vehicle.
 Radiolänkpansarbandvagn (Rlpbv) 3024: Communications vehicle for directed radio communications. Designation means radio relay vehicle.
 Pjäsrekognoseringspansarbandvagn (Pjrekpbv) 3025: Battery reconnaissance vehicle. Designation means cannon reconnaissance vehicle.
 Sjuktransportpansarbandvagn (Sjuktppbv) 3026: Unarmed medical evacuation vehicle. Designation means casualty transport vehicle.

Two more vehicles were developed using the Pbv 302 chassis.
 Bärgningsbandvagn (Bgbv) 82: An armoured recovery vehicle. Designation means recovery vehicle.
 Brobandvagn (Brobv) 941: A bridgelayer. Designation means Bridge vehicle.

See also 
 Tgb m/42 KP
 Pbv 301
 Swedish Armed Forces

Footnotes

External links 
 Hägglunds Vehicle AB site 
 

Armoured personnel carriers of Sweden
Tracked armoured personnel carriers
Military vehicles introduced in the 1960s
Infantry fighting vehicles of the Cold War